Tim Bakens (born 2 November 1982 in Groesbeek) is a Dutch former footballer who played as a centre back. who is the currently assistant manager Eerste Divisie club of Helmond Sport.

Club career
Bakens is a tall central defender who was born in Groesbeek and made his debut in professional football, being part of the De Graafschap squad in the 2001–02 season. He joined FC Volendam from RKC Waalwijk in 2008. He joined Sparta Rotterdam in June 2009. In December 2009 Bakens left Sparta after a conflict about the way of working. In January 2010 he signed with FC Volendam until the end of the season. At the end of the season, he signed with Swiss side St. Gallen. After two seasons, Bakens returned to the Netherlands and signed with SC Cambuur, with which he promoted to the Eredivisie. However, he decided to leave the champion as a free agent. In July 2013, he signed a one-year deal with his former team De Graafschap which plays in the Dutch Eerste Divisie. In June 2014, Bakens had to retire from professional football due to a chronic hip injury.

References

External links
 Voetbal International profile 

1982 births
Living people
People from Groesbeek
Dutch footballers
Dutch expatriate footballers
De Graafschap players
RKC Waalwijk players
FC Volendam players
Sparta Rotterdam players
FC St. Gallen players
SC Cambuur players
Eredivisie players
Eerste Divisie players
Swiss Super League players
Expatriate footballers in Switzerland
Dutch expatriate sportspeople in Switzerland
De Treffers players
Association football defenders
Footballers from Gelderland